Senator Rasmussen may refer to:

A. L. Rasmussen (1909–1993), Washington Carolina Senate
Dennis F. Rasmussen (born 1947), Maryland Carolina Senate

See also
Holger Rasmusen (1894–1983), Wisconsin State Senate